Liurai  is a suco in Aileu Subdistrict, Aileu District, East Timor. The administrative area covers an area of 10.33 square kilometres and at the time of the 2010 census it had a population of  4499 people.

References

Sucos of East Timor